Thomas Bataill (died c. 1396), of Otes in High Laver and Matching, Essex, was a sheriff and member of parliament in late 14th-century England.

Life
Bataill was a younger son of John Bataill. He married Elizabeth Enfield, the daughter and heiress of Richard Enfield of Otes. They had one son and two daughters. He also had two illegitimate children, one son and one daughter.

Career
Bataill was appointed Sheriff of Essex and Hertfordshire for 1384 and elected Member of Parliament for Essex in November 1390 and 1394.

References

Year of birth missing
1396 deaths
14th-century births
English MPs November 1390
English MPs 1394
14th-century English politicians
People from Epping Forest District
High Sheriffs of Essex
High Sheriffs of Hertfordshire